UFC on Fuel TV: Silva vs. Stann (also known as UFC on Fuel TV 8) was a mixed martial arts event held by the Ultimate Fighting Championship on March 3, 2013, at the Saitama Super Arena in Saitama, Japan.

Background
The main event was a light heavyweight bout between multidivisional contenders Wanderlei Silva and Brian Stann.

Diego Sanchez failed to make the 156 lb weight limit at the weigh ins, weighing at 158 lb. Sanchez was fined 20 percent of his earnings and the bout was contested at a catchweight of 158 lb.

Results

Bonus awards
Fighters were awarded $50,000 bonuses.

 Fight of the Night: Wanderlei Silva vs. Brian Stann
 Knockout of the Night: Mark Hunt and Wanderlei Silva
 Submission of the Night: Not awarded as no matches ended by submission.

See also
List of UFC events
2013 in UFC

References

External links
Official UFC past events page
UFC events results at Sherdog.com

UFC on Fuel TV
2013 in mixed martial arts
Mixed martial arts in Japan
Sport in Saitama (city)
2013 in Japanese sport